Doctor Glas, an epistolary novel by Hjalmar Söderberg, tells the story of a physician in 19th-century Sweden who deals with moral and love issues.

Synopsis
The novel is about Dr. Tyko Gabriel Glas who is a respected physician in Stockholm. The story is told in the form of a diary and follows Doctor Glas as he struggles with depression. The antagonist is Reverend Gregorius, a morally corrupt clergyman. Gregorius' beautiful young wife confides in Dr. Glas that her sex life is making her miserable and asks for his help. Glas falls in love with her and agrees to help even though she already has another lover. He attempts to intervene, but the Reverend refuses to give up his "marital rights" — she must have sex with him whether she likes it or not. So, in order to make his love happy, he begins to plot her husband's murder. The novel also deals with issues such as abortion, women's rights, suicide, euthanasia, and eugenics. Not surprisingly, the book triggered a violent campaign against its author who was subsequently vilified in Swedish literary circles.

English translations
In 1963, the first English edition of this novel was published. It featured an introduction by author William Sansom.
In 2002, the latest edition was published by Anchor Books with an introduction by Canadian author Margaret Atwood.

Prequel
In 2004, Swedish author Bengt Ohlsson wrote a book named  Gregorius using Söderberg's character Gregorius and expanded upon his background, explaining why he has become so morally corrupt when readers meet him in Doctor Glas.

Film adaptations 

 1942: a black-and-white Swedish adaptation   directed by Rune Carlsten

 1968: a Danish adaptation directed by Mai Zetterling

External links
Complete Review of Doctor Glas
Complete original Swedish text at Project Runeberg
Introduction to Doctor Glas by Margaret Atwood
Annotations of Doctor Glas at NYU

Swedish novels adapted into films
1905 Swedish novels
Swedish romance novels
Swedish thriller novels
Epistolary novels
Adultery in novels
Works by Hjalmar Söderberg
Swedish-language novels
Novels set in Stockholm
Little, Brown and Company books
Chatto & Windus books